Kim Seong-Yeon (Hangul: 김성연, born 16 April 1991) is a South Korean judoka. She won a bronze medal in the –70 kg at the 2013 World Judo Championships. She was ranked No. 9 in the world as of 8 February 2016. She lost in the second round of the 2016 Olympics to Israeli Linda Bolder.

In 2021, she competed in the women's 70 kg event at the 2020 Summer Olympics in Tokyo, Japan.

Competitive record

(as of 19 February 2016)

References

External links
 

Living people
1991 births
People from Suncheon
South Korean female judoka
Judoka at the 2016 Summer Olympics
Olympic judoka of South Korea
Judoka at the 2014 Asian Games
Judoka at the 2018 Asian Games
Asian Games gold medalists for South Korea
Asian Games silver medalists for South Korea
Asian Games bronze medalists for South Korea
Asian Games medalists in judo
Medalists at the 2014 Asian Games
Medalists at the 2018 Asian Games
Universiade medalists in judo
Universiade gold medalists for South Korea
Universiade silver medalists for South Korea
Medalists at the 2015 Summer Universiade
Medalists at the 2017 Summer Universiade
Judoka at the 2020 Summer Olympics
Sportspeople from South Jeolla Province
21st-century South Korean women